A by-election was held for the New South Wales Legislative Assembly electorate of East Maitland on 18 June 1863 because of the death of James Dickson.

Dates

Result

James Dickson died.

See also
Electoral results for the district of East Maitland
List of New South Wales state by-elections

References

1863 elections in Australia
New South Wales state by-elections
1860s in New South Wales